Taekwondo events have been contested in Deaflympics since 2009 in Taipei, the capital of Taiwan. This was the 21st edition of the event.

Editions

Medal table

All medal count from 2009 Summer Deaflympics to 2017 Summer Deaflympics including kyorugui and poomsae events, the last ones making their debut in the 2013 Summer Deaflympics.

References

External links 
 https://www.deaflympics.com/sports.asp?tk

Deaflympics
Taekwondo